Bai Xuesong (born 12 December 2001) is a Chinese footballer currently playing as a forward for Changchun Yatai.

Career statistics

Club
.

References

2001 births
Living people
Chinese footballers
Association football forwards
Changchun Yatai F.C. players
21st-century Chinese people